Japanese cruiser Yahagi may refer to one of the following cruisers of the Imperial Japanese Navy:

Japanese Navy ship names
Imperial Japanese Navy ship names